Walter Elmore (born 1857, date of death unknown) was a United States Navy sailor and a recipient of the United States military's highest decoration, the Medal of Honor.

Biography
Born in 1857 in England, Elmore joined the U.S. Navy from Toulon, France. On that day, while Gettysburg was in the Mediterranean Sea off the coast of Algeria, he jumped overboard and saved Landsman Wallace Febrey from drowning. For this action, he was awarded the Medal of Honor.

Elmore's official Medal of Honor citation reads:
On board the U.S.S. Gettysburg; for jumping overboard and saving from drowning Wallace Febrey, landsman, while that vessel was under way at sea in latitude 36 degrees 58 minutes north, longitude 3 degrees 44 minutes east, 1 October 1878.

See also

List of Medal of Honor recipients during peacetime

References

External links

1857 births
Year of death missing
United States Navy sailors
United States Navy Medal of Honor recipients
English-born Medal of Honor recipients
English emigrants to the United States
Non-combat recipients of the Medal of Honor